Bulcy is a commune in the Nièvre department in central France.

History
In 1918, during World War I, a field between the towns of Mesves-sur-Loire and Bulcy was the site of a huge American Army hospital.  In November, 1918, there were 20,186 patients and a total of 38,765 wounded and convalescing soldiers spent time at this temporary hospital.  As many as 140,000 Americans were stationed in the area in 1918 so the it had a major American presence.

Population

See also
Communes of the Nièvre department

References

Communes of Nièvre